White Horse Historic District, also known as White Horse Village, is a national historic district located in Willistown Township, Chester County, Pennsylvania. It encompasses 15 contributing buildings and 1 contributing structure in the crossroads village of White Horse. They were built between 1798 and about 1950 and are mostly 2 1/2 or 3-story masonry structures clad in stucco. Seven of the contributing buildings are residences.  The other contributing buildings include the former blacksmith shop (c. 1812 / 1848), (Thomas J. Thornton from Dundalk Ireland was the resident blacksmith from 1948 until his death while shoeing a horse at nearby Radnor Hunt on April 13, 1968), White Horse Store and residence (1798), and White Horse Tavern (c. 1798).  A number of the houses were renovated in the 1930s and 1940s by architect R. Brognard Okie (1875-1945).

It was listed on the National Register of Historic Places in 2001.

References

Historic districts on the National Register of Historic Places in Pennsylvania
Historic districts in Chester County, Pennsylvania
National Register of Historic Places in Chester County, Pennsylvania